The Texas Comptroller of Public Accounts is an executive branch position created by the Texas Constitution.  The comptroller is popularly elected every four years, and is primarily tasked with collecting all state tax revenue and estimating the amount of revenue that the Texas Legislature can spend each biennium. The current comptroller is Glenn Hegar, who took office on January 2, 2015.

History
The predecessor to the current comptroller's office started in 1846.

The longest-serving Comptrollers in Texas history were Robert S. Calvert, who held the post for 26 consecutive years for an unprecedented twelve terms; George H. Sheppard, who served for 18 years over nine two-year terms; and Bob Bullock, who served for 16 years for four four-year terms and later was notable as one of the most powerful Lieutenant Governors in Texas history (and the namesake for the state's official history museum).

Duties currently performed by the comptroller's office were previously divided between it and the office of Texas State Treasurer; however, over time the Texas Legislature transferred most of the Treasurer's functions to the comptroller's office.  The last State Treasurer, Martha Whitehead, successfully campaigned for office in 1994 on the premise of abolishing the position and transferring its few remaining duties to the comptroller's office; upon winning she successfully campaigned the legislature for a Constitutional amendment in 1995 to formally abolish the Treasurer's office which was approved by voters in November of that year.  By 1996, the comptroller had taken over the Treasurer's few remaining duties.

Duties
The primary duty of the comptroller's office is to collect substantially all tax revenue owed to the State of Texas. This involves more than 60 different types of taxes from the sales tax (the largest source of the state's tax revenue, since Texas does not have a personal income tax) to minor items such as the "battery sales fee" (a $2–$3 fee on sales of lead-acid batteries). As Texas uses a unified collection system for sales taxes assessed by both state and local governments, the comptroller's office is responsible for collecting and remitting the local portion of this tax revenue to the various cities, counties, and special districts throughout the state.

The comptroller's office also operates the various prepaid college tuition funds operated by the state through its Prepaid Higher Education Tuition Board, provides reports on fiscal management and economic forecasts, and manages the unclaimed property fund.

As part of its fiscal management responsibilities, Article III, Section 49a of the Texas Constitution requires the comptroller to certify to the Texas Legislature the amount of available cash on hand and anticipated revenues for the next biennium (the two-year period beginning on September 1 of odd-numbered years). The Legislature is not permitted to appropriate any funds in excess of the comptroller's certified amounts (except in cases of emergency and then only with a four-fifths vote of both chambers), and absent the latter the comptroller is required to reject and return to the legislature any appropriation in violation of this requirement.

List of Texas comptrollers

James B. Shaw (D): 1846–1857
Clement R. Johns (D): 1859–1864
Willis L. Robards (D): 1865
Albert H. Latimer (R): 1866
Morgan Hamilton (R): 1867–1869
Albert A. Bledsoe (R): 1870–1873
Stephen Heard Darden (D): 1874–1879
William M. Brown (D): 1880–1882
William Jesse Swain (D): 1883–1886
John D. McCall (D): 1887–1894
Richard W. Finley (D): 1895–1900
Robert M. Love (D): 1901–1903
J. W. Stephen (D): 1903–1910
W. P. Lane (D): 1911–1914
Henry B. Terrell (D): 1915–1919
M. L. Wiginton (D): 1920
Lon A. Smith (D): 1921–1924
Sam Houston Terrell (D): 1925–1930
George H. Sheppard (D): 1930–1949
Robert S. Calvert (D): 1949–1975
Bob Bullock (D): 1975–1991
John Sharp (D): 1991–1999
Carole Keeton Strayhorn (R): 1999–2007
Susan Combs (R): 2007–2015
Glenn Hegar (R): 2015–present

References

External links
Texas Comptroller of Public Accounts

Government of Texas
Comptrollers in the United States
State treasurers of the United States
 
Texas